Plantago cretica is a species of Plantago, family Plantaginaceae known by the common name Cretan plantain.

Description and Biology
It is a tumbleweed, densely tufted annual plant. The leaves are in basal rosette, entire, narrow-linear and woolly, upright, to 15cm. 
The inflorescences and short flowering stalks are densely creamy to brown-hairy, curling downwards after flowering to form a dense mass at the base of the plant. Flowering from March to May.

Habitat
Dry, sandy and rocky soils.

Distribution
This Mediterranean species is from Greece(Aegean islands and Crete), Cyprus, Israel, Lebanon, Syria, Turkey.
It has been introduced in Australia.

References

cretica
Flora of Asia
Flora of Europe
Plants described in 1753
Taxa named by Carl Linnaeus